The 1972–73 Cypriot Second Division was the 18th season of the Cypriot second-level football league. APOP Paphos FC won their 3rd title.

Format
Fourteen teams participated in the 1972–73 Cypriot Second Division. All teams played against each other twice, once at their home and once away. The team with the most points at the end of the season crowned champions. The first team was promoted to 1973–74 Cypriot First Division. The last  team was relegated to the 1973–74 Cypriot Third Division.

Changes from previous season
Teams promoted to 1972–73 Cypriot First Division
 Evagoras Paphos
 ASIL Lysi
 Aris Limassol FC

Teams relegated from 1971–72 Cypriot First Division
 APOP Paphos FC

Teams promoted from 1971–72 Cypriot Third Division
 Ethnikos Asteras Limassol
 Ethnikos Assia FC
 Omonia Aradippou
 Parthenon Zodeia

League standings

See also
 Cypriot Second Division
 1972–73 Cypriot First Division
 1972–73 Cypriot Cup

References

Cypriot Second Division seasons
Cyprus
1972–73 in Cypriot football